The Academy Award for Best Original Song is one of the awards given annually to people working in the motion picture industry by the Academy of Motion Picture Arts and Sciences (AMPAS). It is presented to the songwriters who have composed the best original song written specifically for a film. The performers of a song are not credited with the Academy Award unless they contributed either to music, lyrics, or both in their own right. The songs that are nominated for this award are typically performed during the ceremony and before this award is presented.

The award category was introduced at the 7th Academy Awards, the ceremony honoring the best in film for 1934. Nominations are made by Academy members who are songwriters and composers, and the winners are chosen by the Academy membership as a whole. Fifteen songs are shortlisted before nominations are announced.

The award has only been given to songs in languages other than English four times: in 1960 for "Never on Sunday" (Greek title "Ta Pediá tou Pireá") from Never on Sunday, in 2004 for the Spanish song "Al otro lado del río" from The Motorcycle Diaries, in 2008 for the Hindi song "Jai Ho" from Slumdog Millionaire, and in 2022 for the Telugu song "Naatu Naatu" from RRR.

Eligibility
, the Academy's rules stipulate that "an original song consists of words and music, both of which are original and written specifically for the motion picture. There must be a clearly audible, intelligible, substantive rendition (not necessarily visually presented) of both lyric and melody, used in the body of the motion picture or as the first music cue in the end credits."

The original requirement was only that the nominated song appear in a motion picture during the previous year. This rule was changed after the 1941 Academy Awards, when "The Last Time I Saw Paris", from the film Lady Be Good, with music by Jerome Kern and lyrics by Oscar Hammerstein II, won. Kern was upset that his song won because it had been published and recorded before it was used in the film. Kern was upset because he thought that "Blues in the Night" by Harold Arlen (Music) and Johnny Mercer (lyrics) should have won. Kern's song was actually written in 1940, after the Germans occupied Paris at the start of World War II. It was recorded by Kate Smith and peaked at No. 8 on the best seller list before it was used in the film.

Kern got the Academy to change the rule so that only songs that are "original and written specifically for the motion picture" are eligible to win. Songs that rely on sampled or reworked material along with cover versions, remixes and parodies, such as "Gangsta's Paradise" (which samples "Pastime Paradise" by Stevie Wonder) in the 1995 film Dangerous Minds, are also ineligible.

This rule means that when a film is adapted from a previously produced stage musical, none of the existing songs from the musical are eligible. As a result, many recent film adaptations of musicals have included original songs which could be nominated, such as "You Must Love Me" in the 1996 film Evita (won award), and "Listen", "Love You I Do", "Patience" in the 2006 film Dreamgirls, and "Suddenly" in the 2012 film Les Misérables.

There was a debate as to whether or not Glen Hansard and Marketa Irglova, who were awarded the Oscar in 2008 for "Falling Slowly", were in fact eligible. "Falling Slowly" had been released on two other albums – The Swell Season, Hansard and Irglova's duo project, and The Cost, by Hansard's band The Frames. The Swell Season was released in August 2006, and The Cost in February 2007, before the release of Once. It was also used in the movie Beauty in Trouble and released on its soundtrack in September 2006. However, the AMPAS music committee determined that, in the course of the film's protracted production, the composers had "played the song in some venues that were deemed inconsequential enough to not change the song's eligibility". The same issue arose two years earlier with "In the Deep" from Crash, which appeared on Bird York's 2003 album The Velvet Hour after being written for Crash, but before the film was released. The current Academy rule says an eligible song "must be recorded for use in the motion picture prior to any other usage", so recordings released prior to the film will not disqualify a song as long as the film version was recorded before then.

Number of nominations and submissions
Until the Academy Awards for 1945 (awarded in 1946) any number of songs could be nominated for the award. For the 1945 awards, 14 songs were nominated.

From 1946 to 2011, each member of the Music Branch of the Academy was asked to vote using a points system of 10, 9.5, 9, 8.5, 8, 7.5, 7, 6.5 or 6 points. Only those songs that received an average score of 8.25 or more were eligible for nomination. If no song qualified, there would be no nominees. And if only one song achieved that score, it and the song receiving the next highest score would be the two nominees. This system usually resulted in five nominations each year, except for 2010 when four were nominated, 1988, 2005, and 2008, when only three were nominated; and 2011 when only two were nominated.

Following the two song competition in 2011, the rules were changed once more. The number of nominations is now contingent upon the number of submissions. Depending on the number received by the Academy there would be five, three or no nominations each year. Since then, there have always been five nominees, except in 2013 when one was disqualified.

The first film to receive multiple nominations was Fame in 1980. Only four films have featured three nominated songs: Beauty and the Beast, The Lion King, Dreamgirls, and Enchanted. Dreamgirls and Enchanted lost on every nomination: An Inconvenient Truth original song "I Need to Wake Up" defeated all three of the nominated songs from Dreamgirls, while "Falling Slowly" from Once defeated all three of Enchanteds nominations. After these two consecutive defeats, a new rule was instated in June 2008 that a film could have no more than two songs nominated. While up to five songs from a single film can be submitted, studios sometimes submit only one, for fear that having two nominated might split the vote. By the time "We Don't Talk About Bruno" became the breakout hit from Encanto, the producers had for the 94th Academy Awards submitted "Dos Oruguitas", which was nominated but did not win.

Performances at the awards ceremony
Nominated songs are usually performed live at the televised Academy Awards ceremonies. Although pre-televised ceremonies were broadcast on the radio, the tradition of performing the nominated songs did not begin until the 18th Academy Awards in 1946, in which performers included Frank Sinatra, Kathryn Grayson, Dinah Shore, and Dick Haymes.

In the early years, the songs were usually not performed by the original artists as in the film. For example, in 1965, Robert Goulet performed all the nominated songs at the ceremony. (In the case of "The Look Of Love", sung by Dusty Springfield in Casino Royale, the positive reaction to the performance by Sergio Mendes & Brasil '66 on the 1968 telecast led to their version being released as a single and eventually becoming the bigger hit.) In 1970, this was reversed and only the people who had performed the piece in the film were permitted to perform the song on the live telecast, even if a hit version was performed by another act.

However, since Oscar nominees for 1970, 1971 and 1972 had all been major hit records by other artists, in 1973 the rule was amended again and it became standard to first offer either the original artist or artists who performed the song in the film a chance to perform it at the ceremony, followed by the artist or artists who had the hit record with it.

When neither of those is able to do so (or in rare cases where the telecast producers decide to go with someone else), the Academy chooses more well-known entertainers to perform the song at the ceremony. For example, Robin Williams performed "Blame Canada" from South Park: Bigger, Longer & Uncut at the 72nd Academy Awards instead of the film's voice actors, Trey Parker and Mary Kay Bergman (Bergman died a few months before the show). Beyoncé Knowles sang three nominated songs (one of which was a duet with Josh Groban) during the 77th Academy Awards even though she had not performed those songs in any of the respective films.

That same year, the song "Al otro lado del río" (On The Other Side Of The River), which was featured in the film The Motorcycle Diaries, won the award, becoming the first song in Spanish and the second in a foreign language to receive such an honor (the first winner was the title tune to Never on Sunday, which was sung in Greek in the film by its star, Melina Mercouri). It was written by Uruguayan composer Jorge Drexler, but the producers would not let Drexler perform the song during the show for fear of losing ratings. Instead, the song was performed by Carlos Santana and Antonio Banderas. Drexler's acceptance speech for the award consisted of him singing a few lines a cappella and closed by simply saying "thank you".

In 1985, Phil Collins was passed over to perform his nominated composition "Against All Odds (Take a Look at Me Now)". According to representatives of both Collins' record company and Columbia Pictures, this was because the producers of the telecast were not familiar with his work. Ann Reinking performed the song instead, with Collins sitting in the audience.

At the 80th Academy Awards, "That's How You Know" from the film Enchanted was performed by Kristin Chenoweth, rather than the film's star, Amy Adams. However, Adams performed "Happy Working Song", which was nominated from the same film.

In 2009, Peter Gabriel, who was originally scheduled to perform his nominated song "Down to Earth" during the live broadcast, declined to perform after learning that he would be allowed to sing only 65 seconds of the song during the ceremony's Best Original Song nominee performance medley. Gabriel still attended the ceremony, with John Legend performing the song in his place, backed by the Soweto Gospel Choir.

The 84th Academy Awards did not feature performances from either nominated song ("Man or Muppet" from The Muppets or "Real in Rio" from Rio). No reason for this was given by Oscar producers. This was only the third time that Best Original Song nominees were not performed (the others were in 1989 and 2010). At the 85th Academy Awards, only three of the five nominees were performed, with the eventual winner, the theme from Skyfall, being the only one performed separately on its own as opposed to being part of a musical montage sequence by Adele. The 88th Academy Awards also had three of the five nominees performed. Anohni, performer and writer of "Manta Ray", one of the two nominated songs cut from the ceremony, boycotted the ceremony for this reason.

It was originally announced that the 91st Academy Awards would only feature two live performances due to time constraints: "Shallow" from A Star is Born and "All the Stars" from Black Panther. However, this decision was reversed days later.
It was announced soon after that Kendrick Lamar and SZA would no longer perform due to "logistics and timing" issues, making "All the Stars" the only nominee of the four not to be performed live. Rapper Eminem's song "Lose Yourself", which won the award in 2003, was the only nominated song not performed at the ceremony that year. Eminem later gave a surprise performance of the song at the Oscars in 2020. He received a standing ovation following his performance.

In 2021, performances of the nominees for Best Original Song are shown during the ceremony's pre-show, Oscars: Into the Spotlight. The live performances returned for the next year's ceremony.

Winners and nominees

1930s

1940s

1950s

1960s

1970s

1980s

1990s

2000s

2010s

2020s

Notes

Records

Winners of multiple awards
 Number of nominations in parentheses

4: Sammy Cahn (25) (lyricist)
4: Johnny Mercer (18) (16 as lyricist, 2 as composer and lyricist)
4: Alan Menken (14) (composer)
4: Jimmy Van Heusen (14) (composer)
3: Paul Francis Webster (16) (lyricist)
3: Harry Warren (11) (composer)
3: Ray Evans (7) (composer and lyricist)
3: Jay Livingston (7) (composer and lyricist)
3: Tim Rice (5) (lyricist)
2: Alan and Marilyn Bergman (15) (lyricist)
2: Randy Newman (13) (composer and lyricist)
2: Henry Mancini (11) (composer)
2: Ned Washington (11) (lyricist)
2: Sammy Fain (10) (composer)
2: Howard Ashman (7) (lyricist)
2: Jerome Kern (7) (composer)
2: Burt Bacharach (5) (composer)
2: Oscar Hammerstein II (5) (lyricist)
2: Stephen Schwartz (5) (1 as lyricist, 1 as composer and lyricist)
2: Elton John (4) (composer)
2: Joel Hirschhorn (3) (composer and lyricist)
2: Will Jennings (3) (lyricist)
2: Al Kasha (3) (composer and lyricist)
2: Kristen Anderson-Lopez (3) (composer and lyricist)
2: Robert Lopez (3) (composer and lyricist)
2: Giorgio Moroder (2) (composer)

Most nominations without a win
 14: Diane Warren (composer and lyricist)
 8: Mack David (lyricist)
 5: Harold Adamson (lyricist)
 5: Nicholas Brodszky (composer)
 5: Jimmy McHugh (composer)
 5: John Williams (composer)
 4: Elmer Bernstein (composer)
 4: James V. Monaco (composer)
 4: Cole Porter (composer and lyricist)
 4: Sting (composer and lyricist)
 3: Bryan Adams (composer and lyricist)
 3: Jack Brooks (composer and lyricist)
 3: George Forrest (lyricist)
 3: David Foster (composer)
 3: Kim Gannon (lyricist)
 3: Ira Gershwin (lyricist)
 3: Quincy Jones (composer)
 3: Henry Krieger (composer)
 3: Robert John "Mutt" Lange (composer and lyricist)
 3: Jerry Livingston (composer)
 3: Dory Previn (lyricist)
 3: J. Ralph (composer)
 3: Marc Shaiman (composer and lyricist)
 3: Robert Wright (lyricist)
 3: Victor Young (composer)
 2: Ralph Blane  (lyricist)
 2: Frank Churchill (composer)
 2: Carol Connors (composer and lyricist)
 2: Bill Conti (composer)
 2: Fred Ebb (lyricist)
 2: Roger Edens  (composer)
 2: Eliot Daniel (composer and lyricist)
 2: Sylvia Fine  (composer and lyricist)
 2: Charles Fox (composer)
 2: Siedah Garrett (lyricist)
 2: Friedrich Hollaender (composer)
 2: James Ingram (composer and lyricist)
 2: John Kander (composer)
 2: Burton Lane (composer)
 2: Hugh Martin  (composer)
 2: Paul McCartney (composer and lyricist)
 2: Lin-Manuel Miranda (composer and lyricist)
 2: Larry Morey (lyricist)
 2: Alfred Newman (composer) 
 2: Lionel Newman (composer)
 2: James Newton Howard (composer)
 2: Dolly Parton (composer and lyricist)
 2: André Previn (composer)
 2: Don Raye  (composer)
 2: Ayn Robbins (composer and lyricist)
 2: Bob Russell (lyricist)
 2: Tom Snow (composer)
 2: U2 (composer and lyricist)

Foreign-language song winners
 Manos Hatzidakis was the first to receive this award for a song originally written in a language other than English, in 1960 for "Never on Sunday" (Greek title "Ta Paidia toy Peiraia") from the Greek film Never on Sunday (Greek title Pote tin Kyriaki.
 Jorge Drexler was the second foreign language songwriter to win the Best Original Song Oscar, for "Al otro lado del río" from The Motorcycle Diaries in 2004. That year another foreign language writing pair were nominated, composer Bruno Coulais and lyricist Christophe Barratier for "Look to Your Path" from the French film The Chorus.
 A. R. Rahman and Gulzar are the third and fourth foreign language composer and songwriter respectively to win in the Best Original Song category, which they shared for the Hindi song "Jai Ho" from Slumdog Millionaire, at the 81st Academy Awards in 2008. That same year, "O... Saya", another partly Hindi song from the same film by Rahman and M.I.A., was also nominated, making it the first time two foreign language songs from the same film were nominated in the category.
 M. M. Keeravani and Chandrabose are the fifth and sixth foreign language composer and songwriter respectively to win in the Best Original Song category, which they shared for the Telugu song "Naatu Naatu" from RRR, at the 95th Academy Awards in 2022.

See also
 Critics' Choice Movie Award for Best Song
 Golden Globe Award for Best Original Song
 Grammy Award for Best Song Written for Visual Media

References

Original Song
 
Film awards for Best Song